Leptobrachella itiokai is a species of frog in the family Megophryidae.

References

itiokai
Amphibians described in 2016